The Pensacola Ice Flyers are a professional ice hockey team of the Southern Professional Hockey League. The team played their first season in 2009–10. Home games are played at the Pensacola Bay Center, previously home to the ECHL's Pensacola Ice Pilots from 1996 until their folding in 2008.

The "Ice Flyers" name has a double meaning – it is both a tribute to Pensacola's heritage in naval aviation (Naval Air Station Pensacola is home to the legendary Blue Angels and the National Museum of Naval Aviation) and a homage to original owner Tim Kerr, who previously played eleven seasons with the National Hockey League's Philadelphia Flyers.

On April 14, 2013, the Ice Flyers beat the Huntsville Havoc 2–0 in game three of the President's Cup finals to win the franchise's first President's Cup. The win also solidified the city of Pensacola's first professional sports championship. The Ice Flyers have since won the playoff championship in 2014, 2016, and 2021.

Season-by-season records

Regular season

Post season

Former Ice Flyers who have gone on to represent their country internationally
 Roman Andrejev - Andrejev played for the Ice Flyers during his only season of North American professional hockey in 2013–14. Andrejev represented Estonia prior to his time with the Ice Flyers at both the U18 and U20 levels but he made his debut with the Estonian National Team at the 2014 IIHF World Championship Division II, Group A where he was second on the team and tied for third for in the whole tournament in scoring as the Estonians gained promotion to 2015 IIHF World Championship Division I, Group B. He and the Estonians have competed in Division I, Group B since and have avoided relegation back down to Division II, Group A.
 Joey Hughes - Hughes played his rookie professional season, and last season in North America, with the Ice Flyers during their inaugural season. Hughes had represented Australia in the World Championships prior to playing for the Ice Flyers and was unable to play in the 2010 World Championship due to the SPHL Playoffs. He made his return to the Australian National Team for the 2011 World Championships and also competed in the 2012 edition.

See also
 Pensacola Ice Pilots

References

External links
Pensacola Ice Flyers website
The Southern Professional Hockey League website

Southern Professional Hockey League teams
Ice hockey teams in Florida
Pensacola metropolitan area
Sports in Pensacola, Florida
Ice hockey clubs established in 2009
2009 establishments in Florida